Hopper-Goetschius House is located in Upper Saddle River, Bergen County, New Jersey, United States, and was added to the National Register of Historic Places on January 10, 1983. The house was built in 1739 by Abraham Hopper and sold to Rev. Stephen Goetschius in 1814. It remained in the Goetschius until 1985 when the house was given to the borough of Upper Saddle River. The Upper Saddle River Historical Society now uses the house as a museum.

See also
National Register of Historic Places listings in Bergen County, New Jersey

References

Houses on the National Register of Historic Places in New Jersey
Houses completed in 1739
Houses in Bergen County, New Jersey
Museums in Bergen County, New Jersey
Historic house museums in New Jersey
National Register of Historic Places in Bergen County, New Jersey
Upper Saddle River, New Jersey
New Jersey Register of Historic Places
1739 establishments in New Jersey